On August 3, 1980, presidential candidate Ronald Reagan appeared at the Neshoba County Fair to give a speech on states' rights. The location, which was near the site of the 1964 murders of Chaney, Goodman, and Schwerner was, according to critics, evidence of racial bias.

Choice of location
Republican political strategists chose the Neshoba County Fair for the speech as part of an effort to win over rural voters in the Southern United States. The venue, while also offering the traditional elements of rural county fairs, had become recognized for political speechmaking by 1980. The Ronald Reagan 1980 presidential campaign saw breaking president Jimmy Carter's hold on southern states as critical to winning that year's United States presidential election. The 1980 Mississippi state Republican director, Lanny Griffith, explained:

Some members of the Reagan campaign anonymously expressed their discomfort with the choice to a Washington Post reporter: "It would have been like we were coming to Mississippi and winking at the folks here, saying we didn't really mean to be talking to them Urban League folk. ... It would have been the wrong signal."

Speech 
Reagan was hosted by Republican representative Trent Lott. Approximately 15,000 people attended Reagan's speech. During his speech, Reagan said:

He went on to promise to "restore to states and local governments the power that properly belongs to them". The use of the phrase "state's rights" was seen by some as a tacit appeal to Southern white voters and a continuation of Richard Nixon's Southern strategy, while others argued it merely reflected his libertarian beliefs in economics.

Reception
Coverage of the speech by the media immediately focused on the use of the phrase "states' rights". The headline the next day in The New York Times read, "REAGAN CAMPAIGNS AT MISSISSIPPI FAIR; Nominee Tells Crowd of 10,000 He Is Backing States' Rights." Coverage of Reagan's subsequent campaign stops in the North explicitly linked the location of the speech to the murders of Chaney, Goodman, and Schwerner. On August 6, Douglas Kneeland of the Times wrote, "Adding perhaps to the cautious reception he was given by the Urban League here was Mr. Reagan's appearance Sunday at the Neshoba County Fair in Philadelphia, Miss., where three young civil rights workers were slain in 1964."

States' rights had for decades been a rallying slogan for racial segregationists, including Strom Thurmond in the 1948 presidential election and George Wallace in the 1968 presidential election, and several press writers interpreted Reagan's use of the phrase according to that tradition. Columnist Bob Herbert of the Times wrote, "Everybody watching the 1980 campaign knew what Reagan was signaling at the fair," and that it "was understood that when politicians started chirping about 'states' rights' to white people in places like Neshoba County they were saying that when it comes down to you and the blacks, we're with you". Paul Krugman, also of the Times, noted that a Republican national committee member from Mississippi had urged Reagan to speak at the county fair, as it would help win over "George Wallace-inclined voters", and wrote that this was just one of many examples of "Reagan's tacit race-baiting in the historical record."

Eulogizing on Reagan's death, Washington Post columnist William Raspberry noted of the incident:

Others, including the Washington Post editorial page, contended that there was nothing racist about Reagan's use of the phrase "states' rights" in the context of the speech; National Review criticized Carter's allegations of racism, calling them "frightful distortions, bordering on outright lies." David Brooks of The New York Times responded to the article by fellow Times columnist Krugman, and called the attention paid to the "states' rights" phrase a "slur" and a "distortion."  He wrote that the campaign had been somewhat forced by the county fair organizers who had announced Reagan's appearance, and that the "states' rights" phrase was used in the part of his speech, but that the speech was mostly about inflation and the economy and how it related to schools. Brooks wrote that Reagan had been courting black voters at that time, and he flew to New York City after the speech to deliver an address to the Urban League. In the same article, Brooks does admit, however, that:

This caused Herbert to respond a few days later with an op-ed column titled "Righting Reagan's Wrongs?", in which he wrote:

Aftermath
On November 4, Election Day, Reagan won the state of Mississippi by a narrow plurality of 11,808 votes, including Neshoba County with a 1,293 vote majority.

In subsequent presidential elections, candidates John Glenn and Michael Dukakis both campaigned at the venue.

See also
Speeches and debates of Ronald Reagan

References

External links
 Recording of Reagan's speech.
 "Transcript of Ronald Reagan's 1980 Neshoba County Fair speech" from The Neshoba Democrat
 "Recording of Reagan's Fair speech found" from The Neshoba Democrat

1980 speeches
1980 in Mississippi
Speeches by Ronald Reagan
Neshoba County, Mississippi
1980 United States presidential election
Federalism in the United States
Politics and race in the United States
August 1980 events in the United States
Republican Party (United States) events in Mississippi